is a 2002 music video directed by Takashi Miike.

Cast
Seizo Fukumoto
Koji Kikkawa

Reception
Reviewer Panos Kotzathanasis of Asian Movie Pulse wrote that "the production values are quite higher than what we usually come across in the category, particularly in the samurai part" and that "Kikkawa and Seizo Fukumoto as the leader of the villains add even more coolness to the production", concluding that "this is a work solely addressed to fans of either Miike or Kikkawa, but I feel that no one will be disappointed watching the music video."

References

External links 
 

Films directed by Takashi Miike
2000s music videos
2000s Japanese films